Arekere Lake is situated in the Arekere - Hulimavu area of the city of Bangalore. Originally spread over an area of approximately 37 acres, the lake is bounded on the west by Bannerghatta Road, on the north by BDA Eighty Feet Road, on the east by Shantinikethan Layout and on the south by Hulimavu Main Road. It was possibly a manmade water reservoir created approximately 100 years ago.

The lake is under the jurisdiction of the Bangalore Development Authority (BDA). Also due to rapid urbanization of the rain catchment area of the lake and the consequent lack of seasonal water filling, by the end of the first decade of the 21st century the lake had nearly dried up. In October 2012 the lake was breached, and sewage water flowing out of the lake flooded the nearby residential areas. Following the floods, BDA prepared a detailed plan for the development of the lake at a cost of Rs.14 crore.

Arekere Neighbourhood Improvement Trust (ANIT)
Concerned over the deteriorating quality of the lake, several residents in the area formed a collective called the Arekere Neighbourhood Improvement Trust (ANIT) with the express purpose of coordinating all efforts to rejuvenate the lake. The Trust was registered on 30 June 2012. The formation of the Trust was inspired by the success story of Puttenahalli Neighbourhood Lake Improvement Trust (PNLIT) formed in June 2010. The Trust has succeeded in creating awareness of the need for citizens' initiatives for saving the dying Arekere Lake. This was achieved by organizing several programs, including the formation of a human chain along the boundary of the lake.

In early 2015, BDA began work related to the development of Arekere Lake, along with 16 other lakes in Bangalore. The planned activities include de-silting, weeding, fencing, setting up counter bunds, inlets and outlets, construction of paths for walking around the lakes, and seats for walkers.

References

Lakes of Bangalore